William Arthur Renner, Jr. (born May 23, 1959) is a former punter in the National Football League who played for the Green Bay Packers.  Renner played collegiate ball for Virginia Tech and played professionally for 2 seasons retired in 1987.  Renner also punted for Tazewell High School in Tazewell, VA. Renner was also the former head coach of West Springfield High School in Virginia. Renner is the son of retired U.S. Marine Corps Colonel William Arthur Renner Sr, and the father of Ravens quarterback Bryn Renner and Radio City Rockette, Summer Renner.

Renner coached in the Northern Virginia area before moving to Chapel Hill. He retired from coaching to become a training consultant and author.

References

1959 births
Living people
Minnesota Vikings players
Chicago Bears players
Green Bay Packers players
Virginia Tech Hokies football players